The 2021 Limerick Senior Hurling Championship was the 127th staging of the Limerick Senior Hurling Championship since its establishment by the Limerick County Board in 1887. The draw for the group stage placings took place on 30 June 2021. The championship began on 3 September 2021 and ended on 24 October 2021.

Na Piarsaigh were the defending champions, however, they were beaten by Patrickswell in the semi-final. Monaleen were relegated from the championship after being beaten in a playoff by Blackrock.

The final was played on 24 October 2020 at the TUS Gaelic Grounds in Limerick, between Kilmallock and Patrickswell, in what was their first meeting in a final in 29 years. Kilmallock won the match by 1–24 to 0–19 to claim their 12th championship title overall and a first title since 2014.

Kilmallock's Micheál Houlihan was the championship's top scorer with 1-52.

Team changes

To Championship

Promoted from the Limerick Premier Intermediate Hurling Championship
 Kildimo-Pallaskenry

From Championship

Relegated to the Limerick Premier Intermediate Hurling Championship
 Murroe-Boher

Results

Section A

Group 1 table

Group 1 results

Group 2 table

Group 2 results

Relegation final

Section B

Group 1 table

Group 1 results

Group 2 table

Group 2 results

Promotion final

Knockout stage

Relegation final

Quarter-finals

Semi-finals

Final

Championship statistics

Top scorers

Overall

In a single game

References

Limerick Senior Hurling Championship
Limerick Senior Hurling Championship
Limerick Senior Hurling Championship